Pir Kola Chah (also Romanized as Pīr Kolā Chāh; also known as Pīr Kelā Chāy, Pīrkolāchā, Pīr Kolā Chāy, Pīr Kuleh Chāh, Pīr Kūleh Jāh, and Pirkulekh-Chakh) is a village in Howmeh Rural District, in the Central District of Rasht County, Gilan Province, Iran. At the 2006 census, its population was 1,427, in 410 families.

References 

Populated places in Rasht County